is a horror anthology media franchise centered on a series of survival horror games created by Keiichiro Toyama and published by Konami. The first four video games in the series, Silent Hill, Silent Hill 2, Silent Hill 3 and Silent Hill 4: The Room, were developed by an internal group called Team Silent, a development staff within former Konami subsidiary Konami Computer Entertainment Tokyo. 

The later six games, Origins, Homecoming, Shattered Memories, Downpour, Book of Memories and P.T. (a Silent Hills playable teaser), were developed by other, mostly Western developers. The Silent Hill franchise has expanded to include various print pieces, two feature films, and spin-off video games. As of 2013, the game series has sold over 8.4 million copies worldwide.

Silent Hill is set in the series' eponymous fictional American town. The series is heavily influenced by the literary genre of psychological horror, with its player characters being mostly "everymen".

Installment overview

Main series

Silent Hill (1999)

The first installment in the series follows Harry Mason as he searches for his missing adopted daughter in the mysterious New England town of Silent Hill. Stumbling upon a cult conducting a ritual to revive a deity it worships, Harry discovers his daughter's true origin. Multiple game endings are possible, depending on in-game actions taken by the player. It was released in 1999 for the PlayStation. In 2009, the game became available for download from the European PlayStation Network store for the PlayStation 3 and the PlayStation Portable, and later, in the same year, from the North American PlayStation Network store.

Silent Hill 2 (2001)

The second installment in the series follows James Sunderland searching for his deceased wife in Silent Hill after having received a letter from her informing him that she is waiting for him there. After searching in and exploring the mysterious town, he ultimately realizes her death's true nature. It was released in September 2001 for the PlayStation 2. An extended version of the game was released for the Xbox in December of the same year as Silent Hill 2: Restless Dreams in North America and Silent Hill 2: Inner Fears in Europe, and for the PlayStation 2 in 2003 as Silent Hill 2: Director's Cut, with a port of Director's Cut to Microsoft Windows released in February 2003.

Silent Hill 3 (2003)

The third installment in the series follows a teenage girl named Heather as she becomes caught in a conflict within Silent Hill's cult and discovers her true origin. It was released in May 2003 for the PlayStation 2, with a port to Microsoft Windows released in October of the same year. Silent Hill 3 is a direct sequel to the first installment in the series.

Silent Hill 4: The Room (2004)

The fourth installment in the series follows Henry Townshend, who finds himself locked in his apartment as strange phenomena begin to unfold around him and other residents of the building. It was released in 2004 for the PlayStation 2, Xbox and Microsoft Windows and it also marked the end of Team Silent's contributions to the series.

Silent Hill: Origins (2007)

The fifth installment in the series is a prequel to Silent Hill that follows trucker Travis Grady, who becomes trapped in Silent Hill after rescuing a girl from a burning house. During his quest to find the fate of the burned girl, he encounters characters from the first game and is forced to face his past. It was developed by Climax Studios and released in 2007 for the PlayStation Portable, with a port for the PlayStation 2 released in 2008 and was also the first Silent Hill title developed outside Japan. It is known as Silent Hill Zero in Japan.

Silent Hill: Homecoming (2008)

The sixth installment in the series follows Alex Shepherd, a soldier who has returned from a war overseas. Alex discovers upon his arrival that his father has gone missing, his mother has become catatonic, and no one can provide the whereabouts of his younger brother, Joshua. The game chronicles Alex's search to find his missing brother. It was developed by Double Helix Games and released in 2008 for the PlayStation 3 and Xbox 360 and in 2009 for Microsoft Windows.

Silent Hill: Shattered Memories (2009)

The seventh installment in the series is a reimagining of the first installment. Developed by Climax Studios for the Wii in December 2009, ports for the PlayStation 2 and the PlayStation Portable were released in January 2010. Shattered Memories retains the premise of the original game—Harry Mason's quest to find his missing daughter in the American town of Silent Hill—but is set in what appears to be a different fictional universe, following a different plot, with characters from the first game appearing altered alongside new ones. Gameplay takes place in two parts: a framing, first-person psychotherapy session with an unseen patient, and an over-the-shoulder perspective of Harry's journey through Silent Hill, periodically interrupted by the occurrence of an environmental shift where he is pursued by monsters.

Shattered Memories gameplay focuses on completion of psychological tests which alter in-game elements while in the first setting, and exploration, puzzle solving, and monster evasion when in the second setting. The game's developers avoided integrating combat into the second setting's gameplay, centering instead on a weaponless player character attempting to rescue himself from powerful opponents, as they considered this to be more fear-inducing. The game received generally positive reviews, with its graphics, storyline, voice acting, soundtrack, and use of the Wii Remote as the Wii version's controller praised by reviewers; Shattered Memories chase sequences were criticized by some reviewers, because they deemed them potentially frustrating and short.

Silent Hill: Downpour (2012)

The eighth installment in the series follows Murphy Pendleton, a prisoner who is stranded in Silent Hill after his prison transport vehicle crashes. Formerly announced in April 2010 and developed by Vatra Games for PlayStation 3 and Xbox 360, the game was released on March 13, 2012. It is the only game in the series that can be played in 3D (stereoscopic).

Silent Hill f (TBA)

A new mainline game, entitled Silent Hill f, was announced in October 2022. Developed by studio NeoBards, with creative contributions from writer Ryukishi07, character designer "kera" and producer Motoi Okamoto. It is a story set in Japan during the Shōwa period. The story is being written by Ryukishi07, who wrote the When They Cry visual novel series.

Remakes

Silent Hill 2 (TBA) 

A remake of Silent Hill 2 was announced in October 2022 for the PlayStation 5 and PC. It will be console exclusive on the PlayStation 5 for the first 12 months but will also be released for PC. Akira Yamaoka, the original composer, returns to write the score.

Other games

Play Novel: Silent Hill (2001)
Play Novel: Silent Hill is a visual novel adaptation of the original Silent Hill, released exclusively for the Game Boy Advance in Japan on March 21, 2001.

Silent Hill: The Arcade (2007)
Silent Hill: The Arcade is an arcade game that deals with two characters, Eric and Tina, who have entered the town of Silent Hill and must battle monsters while uncovering the mystery behind Eric's nightmares about a girl and a steamship. The Arcade has a multiplayer element, where each player can choose to be either Eric or Tina. A second player can join the game at any time.

Silent Hill: Orphan (2007)
Silent Hill: Orphan is a mobile game. The game is set in an abandoned orphanage and is played through first-person, point-and-click gameplay.

Silent Hill: The Escape (2007)
Silent Hill: The Escape is a mobile game. It was released in Japan for the FOMA phone December 19, 2007, and was released for the iOS internationally in 2009. The goal of the game is to guide the player through ten stages by finding a key and opening the locked door. The game is played in a first-person perspective. The game achieved mixed reviews due to lack of storyline and poor execution.

Silent Hill: Orphan 2 (2008)
Silent Hill: Orphan 2 is a mobile game, and a sequel to Silent Hill: Orphan.

Silent Hill: Orphan 3 (2010)
Silent Hill: Orphan 3 is a mobile game, and a sequel to Silent Hill: Orphan 2.

Silent Hill HD Collection (2012)
Silent Hill HD Collection is a high-definition re-release of Silent Hill 2 and Silent Hill 3 for PlayStation 3 and Xbox 360, featuring high-resolution visuals, new sounds, new voices and Trophies/Achievements for both games. Silent Hill 2 features the option to use both the old and new voices; however, Silent Hill 3 features only a new voice track, with the old voices unavailable due to legal reasons. Silent Hill 2 features both the main scenario and the Born from a Wish sub-scenario seen in later re-releases, such as the Director's Cut.

This pack marked the first time Silent Hill 3 was playable on an Xbox console. The collection got mixed to negative reviews due to severe issues with both games, such as severe framerate problems, lockups and more. While the PlayStation 3 version was patched, the Xbox 360 patch was cancelled and Konami offered refunds to all Xbox 360 owners of the game.

Silent Hill: Book of Memories (2012)
Silent Hill: Book of Memories was released for the PlayStation Vita. Book of Memories utilizes an overhead isometric view, follows a different storyline and features returning creatures from the series' fictional universe, as well as cooperative gameplay; the game is the first installment in the series to feature multiplayer gameplay, apart from The Arcade. According to series producer Tomm Hulett, Book of Memories gameplay is largely different from the one established in previous installments in the series, focusing on cooperative multiplayer action rather than traditional psychological horror.

Silent Hill: Ascension (2023) 
An interactive media experience known as Silent Hill: Ascension was announced in October 2022. It is being developed by Bad Robot Productions, Behavior Interactive, Genvid Entertainment and DJ2 Entertainment.

Silent Hill: Townfall (TBA) 
A new game, Silent Hill: Townfall, was announced in October 2022 with a reveal trailer. It will be developed by No Code and published by Annapurna Interactive.

Cancelled games

Nintendo DS titles
WayForward Technologies, developers of Silent Hill: Book of Memories, worked on a series installment for the Nintendo DS in 2006. They developed a one-room prototype demo using the lead character and assets from Silent Hill 2 before the game was cancelled.

Renegade Kid pitched their DS title Dementium: The Ward as a Silent Hill spin-off title. It was rejected by Konami for various reasons involving Konami not wanting to trust a small company with the Silent Hill license. Renegade Kid later pitched a modified version of Dementium II which was also rejected, but for Konami simply not wanting to enter the DS space with a horror title at the time.

Silent Hill 5
Before Silent Hill: Origins was made, Team Silent was tasked with working on a fifth installment in the Silent Hill series, simply titled "Silent Hill 5", and development started as early as Silent Hill 3. The game was delayed due to demand from fans wanting to get proper closure for the first game. The planned story of Silent Hill 5 was to focus on a damaged human being summoned to Silent Hill for a certain reason. Akira Yamaoka described the story as "the darkest story we have come up with". 

Another unique feature of the game was to be the fact that it started off in Silent Hill as an everyday town with people going about their lives, which would slowly begin to rot away as players progress in the game.

Broken Covenant
Before Climax Studios started working on what would later become Silent Hill: Origins, they had originally pitched a different game idea to Konami in 2006. Intended to be a PlayStation 3 exclusive, the proposed game would have taken place in Arizona and starred protagonist Father Hector Santos. The priest would have utilized water, a major motif in the game, to perform "holy rites and rituals". The proposal never received a greenlight from Konami, and it was reimagined as an original title called Broken Covenant, but that too was eventually shelved.

Cold Heart
Silent Hill: Cold Heart was the originally planned version of Silent Hill: Shattered Memories. The game would have followed a female protagonist called Jessica Chambers as she decides to take a trip to visit her parents. However, in doing so she becomes trapped in an enormous snowstorm. To save her herself, she follows an ambulance in hopes of finding a safe place, which would leave her to suddely end up in Silent Hill. Compared to Shattered Memories where running is the only way to avoid enemies, the game would have retained the use of Melee Combat from previous games. These combat moments were meant to take advantage of the Wii controller to create a real and intense experience using improvised weapons.

The Box 
Silicon Knights announced the titles in production when the company ceased development in 2012. One of these games was called Silent Hill: The Box, but later became known as The Box, which could have been the codename for the title after a publishing deal fell through given the company's financial status. A screenshot from the game was released via ComputerAndVideoGames.com.

2013 sequel
In 2013, Masahiro Ito was involved in a direct sequel to Silent Hill 3. Ito was displeased with the way the character Pyramid Head was used in later installments of the series and wanted to reintroduce the antagonist Valtiel. An opening scene in the Otherworld involving a baby carriage was also envisioned, in which Valtiel would slaughter Pyramid Head. The game was eventually cancelled, but as late as 2017, Ito has stated that if he ever makes a new game, he would carry out his plan to kill Pyramid Head or just not use him.

Silent Hills

During Sony Computer Entertainment's presentation at Gamescom 2014, an interactive teaser titled P.T. (initialism for "playable teaser") was released on the PlayStation Store for PlayStation 4. The teaser revealed a new Silent Hill game entitled Silent Hills, being developed by Kojima Productions using the Fox Engine, and a collaboration between Hideo Kojima and film director Guillermo del Toro, featuring actor Norman Reedus. On September 1, Sony revealed during its pre-TGS press conference that P.T. had been downloaded over a million times and had been viewed over 30,000,000 times across platforms.

During the 2015 San Francisco Film Festival on April 26, del Toro revealed that he would no longer be involved in the project with Kojima, presumably due to Kojima leaving Konami. Konami later released a statement confirming the departure of Reedus but clarified the series would continue to be developed, with no mention of the current status of Silent Hills. Days later, Konami confirmed that Silent Hills was cancelled, but was open to future collaborations with Reedus and del Toro. P.T. was also pulled from the PlayStation Store and is no longer available for download.

The cancellation of the game was met with significant backlash from fans, who later started a petition on Change.org asking for Konami to continue the project. The petition has received 194,279 signatures . Numerous remakes of P.T. have spawned as a result of the game's extremely limited availability; it remains unavailable on the PlayStation Store, and has since been blocked from running on the PlayStation 5.

Future
In June 2022, in an interview with French gaming website JeuxVideo.Com, Christophe Gans (director of the 2006 Silent Hill movie) confirmed that he had completed a script for a third Silent Hill film, and is aiming for a 2023 release for the project. He later reiterated this in an interview with JeuxActu, and elaborated that the third film project is to be part of what will be a "relaunch" of the Silent Hill brand, accompanied by new video games.

In October, Gans spoke once again about the upcoming relaunch and his third film, stating during an interview at the Strasbourg European Fantastic Film Festival that "I know a bit about the [next Silent Hill game]. I work with Team Silent, the original creators. I work in collaboration with Konami", suggesting that members of the original development team, Team Silent, are involved with the upcoming game(s). On October 19, Konami released a video revealing a new film, Return to Silent Hill, and several new Silent Hill games: a Silent Hill 2 remake, Silent Hill: Townfall and Silent Hill f. Both Akira Yamaoka and Masahiro Ito are confirmed to be returning for the Silent Hill 2 remake; Yamaoka as composer and Ito as the lead concept artist.

Cast and characters

Recurring elements

Plot traits and symbolism
The plots of the installments in the Silent Hill series, except Shattered Memories and The Room, share a common setting: the foggy rural American town of Silent Hill, which is a fictional location set in the northeastern United States: some games specifically reference the town as being located in Maine, whereas in the film the town is set in West Virginia. The town in the first three games was inspired by concepts of a small town in America as depicted by various media from various countries of origin. While some of the development planning is more reminiscent of that of a Japanese village, indirect influence comes from perhaps two factual American towns in particular: Cushing, Maine and Snoqualmie, Washington. The town from the film series, however, was inspired by Centralia, Pennsylvania. Silent Hill is depicted in Shattered Memories as a heavily snow-covered town in the midst of a blizzard, while the events of The Room primarily occur in the fictional neighboring city of South Ashfield, with the player venturing forth to smaller locales around Silent Hill.

The series' player characters experience an occasional dark alteration of reality called the "Otherworld". In that reality, physical law often does not apply, with varying forms but most frequently ones whose physical appearance is based on that of Silent Hill, and the series' characters experience delusions and encounter tangible symbols of elements from their unconscious minds, mental states, and innermost thoughts when present in it, manifested into the real world. The origin of these manifestations is a malevolent power native to Silent Hill, which materializes human thoughts; this force was formerly non-evil, but was corrupted by the occurrence of certain events in the area. 

Some recurring monsters include the Nurses, who are included in almost every Silent Hill game, typically due to the sexual frustration or health conditions many of the protagonists experience during the course of the game's events; Pyramid Head, another recurring monster who became the series mascot, whose canon appearances have been contested; and Robbie the Rabbit, an amusement park mascot. A dog named Mira is also included in many joke endings. Another recurring plot trait in the Silent Hill series is a fictional religious cult known only as The Order. The organization has certain members who act as antagonists in most of the series' installments (such as Dahlia in the first and prequel, Claudia in 3, Walter in The Room, and Judge Holloway in Homecoming), and operates the "Wish House" (also called "Hope House"), an orphanage for poor and homeless children built by a charity organization called the "Silent Hill Smile Support Society". 

The religion followed by the Order is focused on the worship of a chief deity, who is named Samael in Origins, but simply referred to as "God" in the previous games. The group's dogma is derived from a myth: the deity set out to create paradise, but ran out of power during the process; she will someday be resurrected, thus becoming able to finally create paradise and save mankind. The town's cult repeatedly participates in illegal acts: ritual human sacrifices whose purpose is the deity's resurrection, illegal drug trade, and kidnapping and confinement of children in a facility to teach them its dogma through brainwashing, while presenting the facility as an orphanage. Also repeatedly featured are various religious items with magical properties, appearing widely in the games of the series.

Three thematic elements consistently drive the narratives of Silent Hill games: the theme of a main protagonist who is depicted as an "everyman" (with the exception of Homecoming, where the protagonist is thought to be a soldier and the game's mechanics operate as such), and the everyman's quest, either a search for a missing loved one or a situation where the protagonist wanders into the town apparently by accident but is in fact being "summoned" by a spiritual force in the town. 

Multiple endings are a staple of the series, with all installments featuring some, the realization of which often depends on in-game actions performed by the player. In all but two of the series' games, one of these endings is a joke ending in which the main protagonist comes in contact with unidentified flying objects: there is no joke ending in Silent Hill 4: The Room, and the only joke ending in Downpour is a surprise party for the player featuring characters from previous installments of the franchise.

The installments in the Silent Hill series contain various symbolism. The symbols are images, sounds, objects, creatures, or situations, and represent concepts and facts, as well as feelings, emotions, and mental states of the characters.

Gameplay

The installments in the Silent Hill series utilize a third-person view, with occasional fixed camera angles. While visibility is low due to the alternating fog and darkness, all of the series' player characters, except Henry Townshend of Silent Hill 4: The Room, are equipped with a flashlight and a portable device which warns the player of nearby monsters by emitting static (a transistor radio in Origins and the first three installments, a walkie-talkie in Homecoming and Downpour, and a mobile phone in Shattered Memories). 

The player characters of every Silent Hill game have access to a variety of melee weapons and firearms, with Origins and Downpour also featuring rudimentary hand-to-hand combat. Shattered Memories is the sole exception: it is designed without combat and based around evasion of the creatures. Another key feature of the series' gameplay is puzzle-solving, which often results in the acquisition of an item essential to advance in the games.

Development

Concept and influences
Development of the Silent Hill series started in September 1996 with the beginning of the development of its first installment, Silent Hill. The game was created by Team Silent, a group of staff members within the Konami Computer Entertainment Tokyo studio. The new owners of its parent company Konami sought to produce a game that would be successful in the United States. For this reason, a Hollywood-like atmosphere was proposed for it. Despite the profit-oriented approach of the parent company, however, the developers of Silent Hill had much artistic freedom because the game was still produced in the era of lower-budget 2D titles. Eventually, the development staff decided to ignore the limits of Konami's initial plan, and to make Silent Hill a game that would appeal to the emotions of players instead.

The first installment's scenario was created by director Keiichiro Toyama. The story of the second installment, Silent Hill 2, was conceived by CGI director Takayoshi Sato, who based it on the novel Crime and Punishment, with individual members of the team collaborating on the game's actual scenario; the main writing was done by Hiroyuki Owaku and Sato.

The first game, Silent Hill, utilizes real-time 3D environments. To mitigate limitations of the hardware, developers liberally used fog and darkness to muddle the graphics.

Sato estimated the budget of the first installment at US$3–5 million and Silent Hill 2s at US$7–10 million. He said that the development team intended to make Silent Hill a masterpiece rather than a traditional sales-oriented game, and that they opted for an engaging story, which would persist over time – similar to successful literature.

The games are known to have drawn influence from media such as Jacob's Ladder; Phantoms; Session 9; Alien; Stephen King's The Mist; and the art of Francis Bacon, largely through cultivating a technique of inducing fear through more psychological levels of perception. Many sequences and tropes from these films share identical concepts. The films and television series of American filmmaker David Lynch are also acknowledged to have influenced Team Silent during the initial games' production, especially that of Silent Hill 2. 

Another major influence is Japanese horror, with comparisons made to classical Japanese Noh theatre and early 20th-century fiction writers such as the Japanese Edogawa Rampo. The town of Silent Hill is a small rural American town imagined by the creative team. It was based on Western literature and films, as well as on depictions of American towns in European and Russian culture. The version of the town from the film adaptations of the first and third games is loosely based on the central Pennsylvania town of Centralia. 

The Order's religion is based on various characteristics of different religions, such as the origins of Christianity, Aztec rituals, Shinto shrines, as well as Japanese folklore. The names of gods in the organization's religion were conceived by Hiroyuki Owaku, but they have Aztec and Mayan motifs, as Owaku used pronunciations from these civilizations as a reference. Certain religious items appearing in the series were conceived by the team and for some others various religions were used as a basis: the evil spirit-dispelling substance Aglaophotis, which appears in the first installment and Silent Hill 3, is based on a herb of similar name and nature in the Kabbalah (Jewish mysticism); the name of the talisman called "Seal of Metatron" references the angel Metatron.

Audio

The installments in the Silent Hill series feature various sound effects, some of them being ambient, as well as silence; the sound effects have been added with the intent of inducing certain emotions and feelings in the player, such as urgency, displeasure, or a sense of disturbance of their psyche. According to the series' former sound director Akira Yamaoka, atmosphere is an emphasized element of the series, if which had not been given importance, the series' production would have been impossible. The games also feature soundtracks scored by Yamaoka. 

The genres of the musical pieces range from industrial to trip hop to rock, and some pieces include vocals by voice actress Mary Elizabeth McGlynn. The music of Silent Hill 3 and 4 also contains performance and songwriting contributions from musician and voice actor Joe Romersa. Downpour and Book of Memories feature soundtracks scored by composer Daniel Licht; Downpour includes music belonging to the industrial genre and vocals by McGlynn as well as by Jonathan Davis of the band Korn.

Spin-off video games based on the series include the visual novel Play Novel: Silent Hill for the Game Boy Advance, the arcade game Silent Hill: The Arcade, and the mobile games Silent Hill: The Escape and Silent Hill: Orphan.

Reception and legacy

The Silent Hill franchise has been praised for their graphics, atmosphere, and narratives. While the first three installments received critical acclaim, with the fourth game also receiving general praise from critics, later games were less well received.

The first installment in the series, Silent Hill, received a positive response from critics on its release and was commercially successful. It is considered a defining title in the survival horror genre, moving away from B movie horror elements, toward a psychological style of horror emphasizing atmosphere.

Silent Hill 2 received critical acclaim. It was named the fourteenth best game of the PS2 by IGN, saying that "it preserved most of the original game's what-might-be-out-there fear, but with major advances to the graphics and sound, the game was able to deliver a far more immersive, frightful and compelling storyline". Silent Hill 2 is considered one of the best horror games of all time by many, as it features on several "best games ever" lists by critics. 

Praise was particularly aimed at the dark, cerebral narrative and storytelling, exploration and handling of mature themes and concepts, such as incest and domestic abuse, the sound design and musical composition, the atmospheric and frightening tone and direction, fear-inducing and tense gameplay, along with the graphics, use of symbolism and metaphors and the monster designs. Silent Hill 2 is widely considered to be the best installment in the Silent Hill game series and is considered by many to be a modern-day horror masterpiece.

Silent Hill 3 was well received by critics, especially in its presentation, including its environments, graphics and audio, as well as the overall horror elements and themes that are continued from past installments. The game received praise for its story, which was a continuation of the first game's story.

In comparison to the previous three installments, Silent Hill 4: The Room was met with a mostly positive reception, though lower than that of the game's predecessors; many reviewers disliked the increased emphasis on combat, lessening the focus on the horror aspect of gameplay, while praise was aimed at the atmospheric tone and direction, the sound design, graphics and the storyline, while the changes from the series' conventions were met with a range of responses, varying from positive to negative. 1UP.com said that Konami went "backwards" with this game, though reviewers such as GameSpot still praised the game's atmosphere.

Origins received positive reviews despite some criticism. It was praised for going back to the old gameplay formula—according to IGN, Origins does justice to the series as a whole. However, some criticized the series' increasing predictability. GameSpot stated that "this old fog needs to learn some new tricks".

Homecoming received mixed reviews. It was praised for its graphics and audio, but the horror and gameplay have been met with mixed reactions. Some critics, such as GameSpot, felt that it lost "the psychological horror factor that the series is so well-known for". Some critics were harsher; IGN called the game a "letdown".

Shattered Memories received more positive reviews. GameSpot praised the game's effort at reinventing the first game's plot, rather than being a simple remake.

Downpour received mixed reviews. While certain critics praised the soundtrack and story elements, it has been let down by "sluggish combat" and "occasional freezes".

HD Collection has also received mixed reviews. Critics criticised towards many technical issues plaguing both games and artistic changes made to the games. Book of Memories, while receiving mixed reviews, has been the least well received game in the series, with most criticism regarding the game's shift in genre.

The Duffer Brothers have cited Silent Hill as an influence on their 2016 television show Stranger Things. They noted that it inspired the Upside Down, a parallel dimension in the series.

Other media

Print media of the Silent Hill franchise include a series of comic book adaptations; the novels Silent Hill, Silent Hill 2 and Silent Hill 3 by Sadamu Yamashita, which are novelizations of their eponymous video games; the guide book Lost Memories; and the art book Drawing Block: Silent Hill 3 Program.

Konami has announced Silent Hill-themed pachinko machines, one in 2015 and another titled Silent Hill: Escape in 2019.

Downloadable content for the video games Dead by Daylight and Dark Deception: Monsters & Mortals, were released in June 2020 and March 2021 respectively.

Film series

A film adaptation of the first game in the series, Silent Hill, was released in 2006. It was adapted and directed by French film director, producer and writer Christophe Gans. Gans himself is a big fan of the Silent Hill game series. A second film adaptation, titled Silent Hill: Revelation written and directed by M. J. Bassett and based on Silent Hill 3, was released in 2012. Christophe Gans expressed an interest in making a third film in a 2020 interview, stating that a script is being developed centred on puritanism. In October 2022, a sequel to the first film was announced to be in early development, referred to as Return to Silent Hill, with Gans returning to direct and the film being based on Silent Hill 2.

In popular culture
 The Axis of Perdition, an industrial black metal band, recorded Physical Illucinations in the Sewer of Xuchilbara (The Red God), a 2004 EP named after a god from the franchise. There's also a reference to being recorded "in the confines of Toluca Prison", a location from Silent Hill 2. The track lists and tracks themselves also reference Silent Hill and feature music and voice samples, most notably of Claudia Wolf, the main antagonist of Silent Hill 3.
 Dementium: The Ward, a survival horror game for the Nintendo DS, was originally pitched as a Silent Hill game, though it was turned down by Konami.
 The "Upside Down", a location in Stranger Things, a horror series released in 2016, is inspired by the series' foggy town.

References

Notes

External links

 

 
Fictional populated places in the United States
Mass media franchises
Psychological horror games
Konami franchises
Video game franchises introduced in 1999
Video game franchises
Video games set in Maine
Video games adapted into comics
Video games adapted into films
Video games adapted into novels